China Spring Independent School District is a public school district based in the community of China Spring, Texas (USA).

Located in McLennan County, a small portion of the district extends into Bosque County.

In 2009, the school district was rated "recognized" by the Texas Education Agency.

History

In 2016, due to an increase in area residents, the district considered holding a school bond.

Schools
China Spring High (Grades 9-12)
China Spring Middle (Grades 7-8)
China Spring Intermediate (Grades 4-6)
China Spring Elementary (Grades PK-3)

Extracurricular activities
China Spring High School won the UIL State Football Championship in 1978–79 as a 1A high school led by Coach Jim Ed Bird.<ref>UIL Football State Champions  <\ref> The football team went to the state championship game in 2007 as a 3A high school, but lost 14-21 to the Celina Bobcats. On December 17, 2021, the China Spring Cougar football team won their 2nd state title in program history.

The Baseball Team won the State Championship in 2000 as a 3A school, while winning the State Championship in 1987, 1989 and 1993 as a 2A school. 

The girls basketball team won the State Championship in 2006.

The band has a 27-year streak of getting sweepstakes at UIL marching, concert, and sightreading. The Cougar Band has also been to the UIL State Marching contest in 1991 (finalist), 1993 (finalist), 1994, 2000, 2002, 2008, 2010, 2012 (finalist), and 2016 (finalist). The Cougar Band was also named 2016 TMEA 4A Honor band.

State Championships
•Football—1978 (B), 2021 (4A-D2)

•Baseball—1987 (2A), 1989 (2A), 1993 (2A), 2000 (3A)

•Women's Basketball—2006 (3A)

•Women's Golf—1991 (2A), 1992 (2A)

References

External links

China Spring ISD
  alumni site
Anderson, Mike. "China Spring schools hope to benefit from lucrative gas deposit." Waco Tribune-Herald. February 5, 2007.
Doerr, David. "China Spring ISD considering a $22-million bond proposal." Waco Tribune-Herald. February 19, 2007.

School districts in McLennan County, Texas
School districts in Bosque County, Texas